Bremen Eins is a German, public radio station owned and operated by the Radio Bremen (RB).

Radio Bremen
Radio stations in Germany
Radio stations established in 2001
2001 establishments in Germany
Mass media in Bremen (city)